What Cha Gonna Do with My Lovin' is the third album by Stephanie Mills. Released in 1979 and produced by  James Mtume and Reggie Lucas.

Track listing
All songs written by James Mtume and Reggie Lucas except where indicated.

Personnel
Stephanie Mills – lead vocals, backing vocals
Howard T. King – drums
Ed "Tree" Moore, Reggie Lucas – electric bass
Basil Fearington – bass guitar
Joe Caro – acoustic guitar 
Harry Whitaker, Hubert Eaves III – keyboards
Ed Walsh – synthesizer programming
Bashiri Johnson, James Mtume – percussion
Brenda White King, Gwen Guthrie, Lani Groves, Tawatha Agee, Louise Bethune, Mary Johnson, John Simmons, James Mtume, Reggie Lucas, Howard King – backing vocals
Wade Marcus – strings and horn arrangements

Charts

Singles

References

External links
 Stephanie Mills-What Cha Gonna Do with My Lovin' at Discogs

1979 albums
Stephanie Mills albums
Albums arranged by Wade Marcus
20th Century Fox Records albums